Cacheris is a surname. Notable people with the surname include:

James C. Cacheris (born 1933), American judge
Plato Cacheris (1929–2019), American lawyer